Wiltz railway station is a railway station serving Wiltz, in north-western Luxembourg.  It is operated by Chemins de Fer Luxembourgeois, the state-owned railway company.

Service
The station is situated on a branch of the Line 10, which connects Luxembourg City to the centre and north of the country. It is the terminus of the branch, which splits from the main line at Kautenbach.

References

External links

 Official CFL page on Wiltz station
 Rail.lu page on Wiltz station

Railway station
Railway stations in Luxembourg
Railway stations on CFL Line 10